The pearl-bellied white-eye (Zosterops grayi) is a species of bird in the family Zosteropidae. It is native to the Kai Islands in Indonesia.

Its natural habitat is subtropical or tropical moist lowland forests. It is threatened by habitat loss.

References

pearl-bellied white-eye
Birds of the Maluku Islands
pearl-bellied white-eye
Taxonomy articles created by Polbot